The 2019–20 season was the 102nd season of competitive association football in Egypt.

National teams

Kits

Egypt national football team

Results and fixtures

Friendlies

2019 Africa Cup of Nations

Group A

Knockout stage

2021 Africa Cup of Nations qualification

Group G

Egypt national under-23 football team

Results and fixtures

Friendlies

2019 Africa U-23 Cup of Nations

Group A

Knockout stage

Egypt women's national under-20 football team

Results and fixtures

2020 FIFA U-20 Women's World Cup qualification

Preliminary round

CAF competitions

CAF Champions League

Preliminary round

First round

Group stage

Group A

Group B

Quarter-finals

Semi-finals

Final

CAF Confederation Cup

Preliminary round

First round

Play-off round

Group stage

Group A

Quarter-finals

Semi-finals

Final

CAF Super Cup

UAFA competitions

Arab Club Champions Cup

First round

Second round

Quarter-finals

Semi-finals

Men's football

Egyptian Premier League

Egyptian Second Division

Group A

Group B

Group C

Egyptian Third Division

Egyptian Fourth Division

Cup competitions

Egypt Cup

Final

Egyptian Super Cup

Notable deaths
 11 November 2019: Alaa Ali, 31, Zamalek, Telephonat Beni Suef, Smouha, Tala'ea El Gaish, Wadi Degla, Al Masry and Petrojet attacking midfielder/winger.
 23 February 2020: Amr Fahmy, 36, former CAF Secretary General.
 29 February 2020: Mohamed El Essawy, 19, Egypt U20 and Ghazl El Mahalla defensive midfielder.

Notes

References

 
Egyptian